Jordan Kerr and Jim Thomas were the defending champions, but lost in the first round this year.

Robert Kendrick and Jürgen Melzer won in the final 7–6(7–3), 6–0, against Jeff Coetzee and Justin Gimelstob.

Seeds

Draw

Draw

External links
Draw

Campbell's Hall of Fame Tennis Championships - Doubles